Jean Lerda (born 29 September 1929) is a French former professional racing cyclist. He rode the 1956 Tour de France.

References

External links
 

1929 births
Living people
French male cyclists
Cyclists from Marseille